Alexander Ivanovich Greba (born September 23, 1980), known as The Goblin, is a Russian serial killer. In March 2005, he was sentenced to life imprisonment for several murders.

Biography 
Alexander Greba was born on September 23, 1980 in Moshchenoe, in the Yakovlevsky District. His parents divorced when he was barely 2 years old, as his father could not stand tolerating his wife. The mother drank, led a riotous life, stole from home and was hysterical. After the first divorce, she remarried, but the second husband soon abandoned her as well. After that, she took out her anger on her children, especially on Alexander. The family struggled to make ends meet, so from the age of 10, Greba began to steal. After growing up, he fled to the forest, where he lived.

At the age of 16 he was convicted of murder. On that day, it was beginning to get cold, and Greba had to leave the forest. He made his way into a coop, and when the landlady entered, he killed her, because she resembled his mother. Greba was caught at the crime scene and sentenced to 8 years and 10 months imprisonment. In April 2004, he was released on parole.

In the media 
 Documentary film "Leshy" from the series "Criminal Chronicles" (2009).

See also
 List of Russian serial killers

References

External links 
 Belgorod maniac killed women resembling his mother
 Victims of the serial killer were the same old people

1980 births
Living people
Male serial killers
Murder committed by minors
Russian serial killers